Air Astra is a privately owned Bangladeshi passenger airline headquartered in Dhaka and based at Shahjalal International Airport under the Astra Airways Limited.

History
The airline was expected to commence its operation in January, 2022. However, the dates were pushed forward further into 2022 and after acquiring their Air operator's certificate the airline was cleared to commence its operations. Air Astra, the first private airline to be introduced in Bangladesh since 2013, started its commercial operation on 24 November 2022, with Dhaka as its hub. The airline inaugurated its operation with three weekly flights on Dhaka–Cox's Bazar–Dhaka route and two weekly flight on Dhaka-Chittagong–Dhaka route. On 7 December 2022, This new airline launched Dhaka - Sylhet flight for first time. Air Astra expected to launch flights on all domestic routes in phases.

Corporate Affairs
The airline has its corporate headquarter at Siam Tower in Uttara, Dhaka–1230 and it has its registered office at Banani, Dhaka–1213.

Destinations

Fleets

The airline started its commercial operation with two ATR 72-600 and expected to receive two more aircraft of the same type by early 2023. The airline is planning to increase its total number of fleet to 10 aircraft by 2023.

As of December 2022, Air Astra fleet consists of the following aircraft:

See also
 List of airlines of Bangladesh
 Transport in Bangladesh

References

External links

 

Uttara
Airlines of Bangladesh
Airlines established in 2022
Bangladeshi companies established in 2022